Croxley Green Windmill is a Grade II listed tower mill at Croxley Green, Hertfordshire, England which has been converted to residential accommodation.

History

Croxley Green Windmill was built c1860. Isaac Watts was the miller in 1861. He was living at Warden Hill near Luton, Bedfordshire in 1859. The mill was working by wind until the sails were blown off in the 1880s and from 1886 is recorded as having worked by steam engine only. The mill was last used to grind wheat in 1899 and after that it was used as a saw mill and turnery. By the 1930s the mill was used as a chicken house and pigeon loft. During the Second World War it was used as an Air Raid Precautions observation post, with an air raid siren mounted on the tower. The mill was converted to residential accommodation in the 1960s

The Windmill and 1960's residential extension are currently going through a restoration project to bring it up to modern standards started in 2019.

Description

Croxley Green Mill is a five-storey tower mill with a stage at second floor level. It had a boat shaped cap winded by a fantail. The four Patent sails drove three pairs of millstones.

Millers
Isaac Watts 1861-62
Philip Howard 1862-65
J Batchelor 1865-70
William Caldwell 1870-74
Ephraim Holloway 1874-95
Hannah Holloway 1895-1900

Reference for above:-

References

External links
Windmill World webpage on Croxley Green Mill.

Industrial buildings completed in 1860
Windmills completed in 1860
Windmills in Hertfordshire
Tower mills in the United Kingdom
Grinding mills in the United Kingdom
Grade II listed buildings in Hertfordshire
Grade II listed windmills
1860 establishments in England